Roissy-en-Brie (literally Roissy in Brie) is a commune in the Seine-et-Marne department in the Île-de-France region in north-central France and is located in the eastern suburbs of Paris,  from the center.

History
In 1810 Roissy-en-Brie annexed the neighboring commune of Pontcarré. In 1829 Pontcarré seceded and was restored as a separate commune.

Population

Transportation
Roissy-en-Brie is served by Roissy-en-Brie station on Paris RER line .

Demographics
The inhabitants are called Roisséens.

See also
Communes of the Seine-et-Marne department

References

External links

Official website (in French)

Communes of Seine-et-Marne